The Believe Tour was the second concert tour by Canadian singer Justin Bieber. It was launched in support of his third studio album, Believe (2012). Beginning in September 2012, the tour played over 150 shows in the Americas, Europe, Asia, Africa, and Oceania.

In 2012, the tour placed 23rd on Pollstar's "Top 50 Worldwide Tours". The tour earned $40.2 million from 35 shows. For 2013, it ranked 5th on Pollstar's "Top 100 Worldwide Tours—Mid Year"; earning $69.9 million from 67 shows.

Background 
The tour was announced in May 2012, during Bieber's appearance on The Ellen DeGeneres Show. Dates were revealed for shows in the United States and Canada later in the day. Bieber stated the tour would be the biggest show on Earth. Shows in the United Kingdom were reported in July 2012, with the tour expected to reach Asia, Oceania, South America, along with South Africa and the Middle East sometime in 2013. Although the North American portion of the tour was set to end in January of 2013, Bieber announced a second leg; 30 additional dates were added at various venues in the United States and Canada throughout the summer of 2013. 

Rehearsals began in late July 2012 at the Long Beach Arena in Long Beach, California. Bieber and his crew would conduct 10-hour rehearsal days. He stated he had a lot to prove with this tour.

The tour was an early success in the United States, with many dates selling out in one hour. The two shows at Madison Square Garden were sold out in 30 seconds. In August, the singer conducted an online search for dancers on the tour.

The tour kicked off in Glendale, Arizona at the Jobing.com Arena. The premiere made headlines for Bieber feeling ill during the show. His performances of "Out of Town Girl" and "Beauty and a Beat" were interrupted as the singer vomited on and off stage.

Justin Bieber reported further troubles during the concert at the Tacoma Dome in Tacoma, Washington. After the show, Bieber tweeted his personal laptop and camera were stolen during the show. Many fans lashed out against the arena while others believed the incident was a hoax. Three days following the show, Vevo premiered the video for the singer's third single with an opening message: "In October 2012, three hours of personal footage was stolen from musician Justin Bieber. The following footage was illegally uploaded by an anonymous blogger." Many media outlets reported the theft was a hoax to promote the music video. However, the singer's management still affirm property was stolen.

When reflecting on the Believe Tour, Bieber's favorite moment was his introduction when he would come down from the top of the stage in wings, and remain above the audience for about 30 seconds. Bieber explained, "It's going to be such a memorable moment from any tour. I think people will remember that. Coming down right from the beginning of the show, it's me and the wings for about 30 seconds. It's such a big moment. People are just captivated and there's nothing else going on, so that moment is going to bleed into their memory."

Critical response 

For the tour premiere, Christina Fuoco-Karasinski (SoundSpike) felt his fans still suffered from Bieber Fever until she realized the vast amount of differences among ages. "Bieber, a native of Stratford, Ontario, Canada, provided a show that made the cavernous arena seem intimate. Massive amounts of lasers sliced through the 15,000-seat venue, breaking Jobing.com Arena into several sections."

For the show in Los Angeles, Matt Kivel (Variety) called the show epic yet strangely incoherent. He writes, "Without the pomp and glitz, his talent is unquestionable and the acoustic tracks allowed for a welcome respite from the sensory overload that characterized the evening. [...] His ambition has never been in question, but a greater thematic focus would go a long way toward helping Bieber reach the level of maturity for which he strives."

For the same show, Sophie A. Schillaci (The Hollywood Reporter) says the show is absurd for those outside of Bieber's fanbase. She continues, "Vocally, Bieber shined the most with an acoustic performance of 'Fall', during which he strummed a guitar while propped up high above the stage. Through the rest of his set, which also included a high-energy if way too brief montage of 'One Time', 'Eenie Meenie' and 'Somebody to Love', the singing appeared to take a back seat to the dance moves and pyrotechnics, but audience interaction kept his fans coming back for more."

Peter Hartlaub (San Francisco Chronicle) praised the stage design during the concert at the Oracle Arena. However, the critic also relayed the scripted nature of the production, stating, "Every decision on the night seemed like a calculated part of Bieber's attempt to execute a full Timberlake, and move from preteen deity to full-blown cross-generational pop star." For the concert at the Scotiabank Saddledome, Mike Bell (Calgary Herald) called the show a sensory catnip for tweens. He says, "The almost two-hour concert was so synthetic and filled with fake moments that it was difficult to actually discern what was being sung live and what was Memorex, with most of the songs such as 'All Around the World', 'One Time' and 'Beauty and the Beat' being so stripped of all humanity that they were merely one more element to the flash and bang taking place around it. Only on the odd occasion—songs such as 'Die In Your Arms', the acoustic 'Be Alright' and 'Beautiful', his duet with opener Carly Rae Jepsen—did he show off any real, albeit underwhelming, vocal talent, and even then it was difficult not to look at him and wonder if behind the screens and the curtain, there wasn't a tinman pushing the buttons and counting his money as the clock ticked down"

Concert Synopsis

Set list 
This set list is representative of the show in Las Vegas on June 28, 2013. It does not represent all concerts for the duration of the tour.

 "All Around the World"
 "Take You"
 "Catching Feelings"
 "One Time" / "Eenie Meenie" / "Somebody to Love" 
 "Love Me Like You Do"
 "She Don't Like the Lights"
 "Die in Your Arms"
 "Out of Town Girl"
 "Be Alright"
 "Fall"
 "Never Say Never"
 "Beauty and a Beat"
 "One Less Lonely Girl"
 "As Long As You Love Me"
 "Believe"
 "Boyfriend"
 "Baby"

Shows

Cancelled shows

Notes

References

External links 
 Justin Bieber's Official Website

2012 concert tours
2013 concert tours
Justin Bieber concert tours